The Party of the National Will or National Will Party, formerly named Vatan Party and Halqa Party, was an Anglophile political party in Iran, led by Zia'eddin Tabatabaee. The party played an important role in anti-communist activities, specifically against Tudeh Party of Iran, and was rival to other leftists and civic nationalists who later emerged as the National Front.

Widely regarded as dedicated to promote British influence in Iran, it enjoyed support from Embassy of the United Kingdom and British agents such as Robert Charles Zaehner. After the British indecisive policy as a result of the Labour Party victory in the 1945 elections, the party was demoralized and went on hiatus in February 1946 when its key members were arrested by Prime Minister Ahmad Qavam. The party returned in September 1951 to oppose Mohammad Mosaddegh and the nationalization of the Iran oil industry movement, but collapsed after two months.

References

Political parties established in 1943
1943 establishments in Iran
Political parties disestablished in 1951
1951 disestablishments in Iran
Nationalist parties in Asia
Conservative parties in Iran
Anti-communist parties
Fascist parties
Right-wing parties in Iran
Fascism in Iran